The seventh son of a seventh son is a concept from folklore regarding special powers given to, or held by, such a son. To qualify as "the seventh son of a seventh son" one must be the seventh male child born in an unbroken line with no female siblings born between, and to a father who himself is the seventh male child born in an unbroken line with no female siblings born between. The number  has a long history of mystical and biblical significance, such as seven virtues, seven deadly sins, Seven Sleepers and Seven Heavens.

In some beliefs, the special powers are inborn, inherited simply by virtue of his birth order; in others, the powers are granted to him by God or the gods because of his birth order.

Regional variations

Ireland
The seventh son of a seventh son is gifted as a healer. The seventh son of a seventh son is part of a more general phenomenon known as the "cure" (sometimes also called the "charm").

United States
According to Edward Augustus Kendall in Travels through the Northern Parts of the United States, in the year 1807–1808 while visiting the Newgate copper mine and prison, the author met an innkeeper who told him that "there was to be found in the surrounding hills, a black stone, of a certain species, through which a seventh son of a seventh son, born in the month of February, with a caul on his head, can discern everything that lies in the depths and interior of the globe." The author speculates that the importance of mining to the community gave rise to this localized belief.

Latin America
To prevent this, the newborn should be baptized in seven different churches. Alternately, he may be baptized under the name Benito, with his eldest brother (the eldest son of their father) as his godfather.

Italy
In Italian legend, "Ciarallo" was a seventh son of a seventh son who had the power to enchant and recall snakes, and who was immune to snake venom. Ciarallo was not only a seventh son, but underwent a special initiation rite called "inciaramazione". Customarily, one would ask Ciarallo's intercession when a snake was discovered in the house. Ciarallo would answer these requests by attracting the snake with a whistle. He would also perform the inciaramazione rite on other people to ensure protection from snakes by spreading a special oil on their arm. Children were led to Ciarallo by their mothers to get protection.

Romania 
Raymond T. McNally and Radu Florescu describe the Transylvanian folk belief that "the seventh son of a seventh son is doomed to become a vampire."

Alleged real-life examples
 James Murrell was the seventh son of a seventh son, according to investigations by Arthur Morrison.
 Abram George (1916?–?), Mohawk faith healer from Akwesasne, claimed in contemporary news reports to have been the seventh son of a seventh son.
 Archille Noé Baillargeon (1889–?) from Tecumseh, Ontario was the seventh son of a seventh son and was believed to have extraordinary healing powers.
 Although singer Perry Como claimed to be a seventh son, he had two older sisters and only one older brother who survived to adulthood plus three preceding siblings who died in infancy.
 Pro football Hall of Famer Len Dawson was the seventh son of a seventh son, born the ninth of 11 children.

References

External links
 Seventh Sons and Their Seventh Sons: A passage from Chambers' Book of Days with information about the belief in the UK, France, and Germany.

Folklore
European mythology
Superstitions about numbers
Brothers
Curses